Brian Kingston (born 22 February 1966) is a British Unionist politician from Northern Ireland representing the Democratic Unionist Party (DUP).

Kingston has been a Member of the Northern Ireland Assembly (MLA) for Belfast North since the May 2022 election.

He was previously a member of Belfast City Council, for the Court constituency for 12 years, from May 2010 to May 2022, including serving as High Sheriff of Belfast in 2013 and Lord Mayor of Belfast from 2016 to 2017.

References 

Living people
Democratic Unionist Party MLAs
21st-century British politicians
Northern Ireland MLAs 2022–2027
Politicians from Belfast
Lord Mayors of Belfast
1966 births
Members of Belfast City Council
Democratic Unionist Party councillors